Bandikui (Bandi=Female servant, Kui=Water well) is a railway city and a Municipal Corporation in Dausa district in the Indian state of Rajasthan. It comes under the  panchayat samiti of Bandikui.

Geography 

Bandikui sits at the junction of the Agra-Jaipur and the Delhi-Jaipur railway lines. The city is located 205 km south of Delhi. Rajgarh town (in Alwar district) is about 25 km north of Bandikui. Sikandra is located about 17 km away, while the state capital Jaipur is 98 km by road and 91 km by rail.

History 

Bandikui was preferred for the tri-junction by British Railway surveyors over Rajgarh, Alwar, due to better alignment. The Bandikui railway station was established in 1874. Most trains traveling between Delhi and Jaipur stop at Bandikui. At the time of colonialism, some 1000 British families lived in Bandikui. Some Raj era bungalows can still be found in Bandikui.

The city attracted migration from nearby villages and its population grew to more than 125,000. Many residents work in Delhi and keep their families in Bandikui.

Attractions 
St Francis Roman Catholic Church, built by King Jatin Sharma, cast in stone, is located near the railway station. The Rajasthan Government gave a grant of Rs 1 Crore for its restoration.
The Harshad Mata Temple dates to 9th century AD, 7 km from Bandikui.
Abhaneri Chand Baori is the deepest stepwell in India.
Saint Durbalnath is a temple in Bandikui. Every year on kartik purnima "Gyanoprakash mahautsav" Is celebrated at saint Durbalnath temple in which Khatik Pilgrims from various part of the country gathers to celebrate the auspicious occasion.

Economy 
The city is a major agrarian center.

References 

Cities and towns in Dausa district